Ó Gnímh was the surname of an Irish brehon family.

The Ó Gnímh family were based at Larne, County Antrim, and were hereditary poets for the O'Neill's and MacDonalds.

The surname is now generally rendered as Agnew.

See also

 Fear Flatha Ó Gnímh
 Eoin Ó Gnímh

External links
 http://www.irishtimes.com/ancestor/surname/index.cfm?fuseaction=Go.&UserID=

References

 The family of Ó Gnímh in Ireland and Scotland: a look at the sources, pp. 57–71 in Nomina 8 (1984), Brian Ó Cuív.

Surnames
Irish families
Irish Brehon families
Surnames of Irish origin
Irish-language surnames
Families of Irish ancestry